Angolan cuisine has many dishes popular among nationals and foreigners. One of the most popular being funge (which is made from the cassava or corn flour), mufete (having grilled fish, plantain, sweet potato, cassava, and gari). There is also calulu, moamba de galinha, moamba de ginguba, kissaca and so many more delicious dishes. In addition, there is also the extremely popular mukua sorbet.

Ingredients
Staple ingredients include beans and rice, pork and chicken, various sauces, and vegetables such as tomatoes, onions. Spices such as garlic are also frequently seen. Funge, a type of porridge made with cassava is a staple dish.

There are many influences from Portuguese cuisine like the use of olive oil. Piripiri is a local hot sauce.

Dishes

Funge (or funje) and pirão are very common dishes, and in poorer households often consumed at every meal. The dish is often eaten with fish, pork, chicken, or beans. funge de bombo, more common in northern Angola, is a paste or porridge of cassava (also called manioc or yuca), made from cassava flour. It is gelatinous in consistency and gray in color. Pirão, yellow in color and similar to polenta, is made from cornflour and is more common in the south. Fuba is the term for the flour that is used to make either funge and pirão, also used to make angu, the Brazilian polenta. Both foods are described as bland but filling and are often eaten with sauces and juices or with gindungo (see below), a spicy condiment.

Moamba de galinha (or chicken moamba) is chicken with palm paste, okra, garlic and palm oil hash or red palm oil sauce, often served with rice and funge. Both funge and moamba de galinha have been considered the national dish. A variant dish of moamba de galinha, moamba de ginguba, uses ginguba (peanut sauce) instead of palm paste.

List of dishes
Other dishes common in Angolan cuisine include:

Arroz (rice) dishes, including arroz da Ilha (rice with chicken or fish), arroz de garoupa da Ilha ((rice with grouper), and arroz de marisco (white rice with seafood, typically prawns, squid, white fish, or lobster). 
Cabidela, a dish cooked in blood, served with rice and funge. Frequently chicken (galinha de cabidela, galinha à cabidela), served with vinegar, tomatoes, onion and garlic. It was also incorporated to Brazilian cuisine.
Caldeirada de cabrito, goat meat stew served with rice, a traditional dish for Angolan independence day, November 11.
Fish stews, including caldeirada de peixe, made with "whatever is available" and served with rice, and muzongue, made from whole dried and fresh fish cooked with palm oil, sweet potato, onion, tomato, spinach, and spices, and served with rice, spinach, funje, and farofa; some Angolans believe that the stew is a hangover cure if eaten before the onset of the headache.
Calulu, dried fish with vegetables, often onions, tomatoes, okra, sweet potatoes, garlic, palm oil, and gimboa leaves (similar to spinach); often served with rice, funge, palm oil beans, and farofa.
Caruru, a shrimp and okra stew, of Brazilian origin.
Catatos, caterpillar fried with garlic, served with rice; a specialty in Uíge
Chikuanga, a bread made from manioc flour, served in a wrap of banana leaves; a specialty of northeast Angola.
Cocada amarela ( or ), yellow coconut pudding made with sugar, grated coconut, egg yolks, and ground cinnamon, a dessert in both Mozambique and Angola. It is very different from what is known as cocada in Brazil.
Doce de ginguba, peanut candy.
Farofa, rice and beans with toasted manioc flour on top; a dish of Brazilian origin common in Angola. 
Feijão de óleo de palma or dendem, beans, onion, and garlic cooked in palm oil; often served with fish, banana and farofa.
Frango (grelhado) piri-piri, native to Angola and Mozambique, also a former Portuguese colony; a grilled chicken in a very hot marinade of piri piri hot pepper and sometime also minced chili peppers, salt, and lemon or lime juice.
Gafanhotos de palmeira, toasted grasshopper from a palm tree, a Cuanza Norte specialty; often served with funge.
Gindungo, a spicy condiment made of chili pepper, garlic, onion, and sometimes brandy; thought by some Angolans to be an aphrodisiac
Jinguinga, goat tripe and blood, a specialty of Malanje, often served with rice and funge.
Kifula, game meat served with boiled and toasted palm tree grasshoppers, a specialty of Cuanza Norte, served with funge.
Kissuto rombo, roasted goat with garlic and lemon juice, served with rice and chips.
Kitaba or quitaba, a crunchy peanut paste seasoned with chilli pepper.
Kitetas, clams, often cooked in a white wine sauce and served with bread.
Kizaka, the leaves of the manioc plant, similar to spinach and often prepared with ginguba (peanut) and finely chopping and seasoned Kizaka com peixe is kizaka with fish, onion, and tomato, served with rice and funge.
Leite azedo com pirão de milho, a Huíla specialty, sour milk with maize porridge.
Mafuma, frog meat, a Cunene specialty.
Mariscos cozidos com gindungo, lobsters, prawns, and clams cooked in seawater, served with rice and hot sauce
Mousse de maracujá, a mousse of passionfruit native to Brazil but popular in Angola.
Mufete de kacusso (or cacusso,), grilled fish, often river tilapia, in a rich sauce of onion, vinegar, and spices, variously served with palm oil beans and cooked manioc, rice, sweet potato, or farofa.
Mukua, dried fruit of the baobab tree, often made into ice cream.
Molho cru, sauce or paste served with seafood and fish, made of garlic cloves, scallions (spring onions), parsley, cumin, salt, vinegar, and water.
Ngonguenha, toasted manioc flour, sugar, and milk, a savory dish.
Papaya with port wine.
Pavê de ginguba, peanut sponge cake dessert.
Pé-de-moleque, peanut-and-caramel candy.
Quiabos com camarão, prawns with okra, garlic, onion, and tomato, served with rice.
Tarco, radishes with peanuts, palm oil, tomatoes, and onions, served alongside meat or fish.

Beverages

A number of beverages, alcoholic and non-alcoholic, are typical to Angola.

Various homemade spirits are made, including capatica (made from bananas, a Cuanza Norte specialty), caporoto (made from maize, a Malanje specialty); cazi or caxipembe (made from potato and cassava skin); kimbombo (made from corn), maluva or ocisangua (made with palm tree juice, sometimes described as "palm wine," a Northern Angola specialty), ngonguenha (made from toasted manioc flour), and ualende (made from sugarcane, sweet potato, corn, or fruits, a Bie specialty). Other beverages are Kapuka (homemade vodka), ovingundu (mead made from honey), and Whiskey Kota (homemade whisky).

Popular non-alcoholic drinks including Kissangua, a Southern Angola specialty, a traditional non-alcoholic drink made of cornflour, have been used in indigenous healing rituals. Soft drinks such as Coca-Cola, Pepsi, Mirinda, Sprite, and Fanta are also popular. While some soft-drinks are imported from South Africa, Namibia, Brazil, and Portugal, the Angolan soft-drink industry has grown, with Coca-Cola plants in Bom Jesus, Bengo, and Lubango opening since 2000.

Mongozo is a traditional homemade beer made from palm nuts, a specialty of the Lundas (Lunda Norte and Lunda Sul). Mongozo was brewed by the Chokwe people before the arrival of Europeans, and mongozo is now commercially produced for export, including to Belgium, where it is produced by Van Steenberge.

Various commercial beers are brewed in Angola, the oldest of which is Cuca, brewed in Luanda. Others include Eka (brewed in Dondo in Cuanza Norte), N'gola (brewed in Lubango), and Nocal (brewed in Luanda).

See also
African cuisine
West African cuisine

References

External links

 
Central African cuisine